Bicester Village is a designer outlet shopping centre on the outskirts of Bicester, a town in Oxfordshire, England. It is owned by Value Retail plc. The centre opened in 1995.

The centre is the second most visited location in the United Kingdom by Chinese tourists, after Buckingham Palace.

Expansion
On 17 April 2015 Cherwell District Council approved plans to demolish the nearby Tesco store and to construct a further 28 retail units and an extra 519 parking spaces. A new Park & Ride and major road improvements, funded by the centre's owners, were also announced. It is hoped that this expansion will create around 3,500 new jobs in Bicester Village.

The new stores opened on 19 October 2017.

Public transport links

The centre is also served by the X5 express coach service between Oxford and Cambridge via Milton Keynes and Bedford. It is also served by the BV1 local bus service that takes a circular route calling at Bicester Village station, Bicester bus station (for central Bicester) and Bicester North railway station as well as this shopping centre.

References

External links
 
 Bicester Village on Google Maps

Shopping centres in Oxfordshire
Outlet malls in England
Bicester
Tourism in the United Kingdom